Saint John Parish or Parish of St John may refer to:
Parish of St. John the Baptist Catholic Church (Canton, Ohio)
Parish of St John, Cumberland County, New South Wales, Australia
Saint John Parish, Antigua and Barbuda
Saint John Parish, Barbados
Saint John Parish, Dominica
Saint John Parish, Grenada
Saint John Parish, Tobago
St. John the Baptist Parish, Louisiana
St. John the Baptist Parish, Salem

See also
St. John's Parish (disambiguation)

Civil parishes in the Caribbean
Parish name disambiguation pages